Yahya ibn Ismail al-Mamun (died 1075) was the second ruler of the Berber Hawwara Dhulnunid dynasty who was king of the Taifa of Toledo between 1043 and 1075.

Biography 
Yahya ibn Ismail succeeded his father Ismaïl ibn Dhi 'l-Nun in 1043. In 1062, he promised his allegiance to king Ferdinand I of León and Castile, a fact that did not prevent him from giving military support to his son-in-law Abd al-Aziz ibn Amir, king of the Taifa of Valencia, when the Castilian king laid siege to the city in 1065. When Ferdinand I saw himself forced to end the siege and remove his army, Al-Mamun agreed to a union with the Taifa of Valencia which was to form a part of the Toledo taifa until 1092. He died at Córdoba in 1075.

References 

1075 deaths
Emirs
11th-century Berber people
Berber rulers
11th-century rulers in Al-Andalus
Year of birth unknown
Taifa of Toledo